In building construction, topping out (sometimes referred to as topping off) is a builders' rite traditionally held when the last beam (or its equivalent) is placed atop a structure during its construction. Nowadays, the ceremony is often parlayed into a media event for public relations purposes.  It has since come to mean more generally finishing the structure of the building, whether there is a ceremony or not. Also commonly used to determine the amount of wind on the top of the structure.
Another, more functional reason, that a pine tree was hoisted to the top of framed out buildings (topping-out) was that it was a Scandinavian tradition to hoist the tree. When the pine needles fell off, they knew the wood frame below had cured/dried-out so they could in-close the building.

History
The practice of "topping out" a new building can be traced to the ancient Scandinavian religious rite of placing a tree atop a new building to appease the tree-dwelling spirits displaced in its construction. Long an important component of timber frame building, it migrated initially to England and Northern Europe, thence to the Americas.

A tree or leafy branch is placed on the topmost wood or iron beam, often with flags and streamers tied to it.  A toast is usually drunk and sometimes workers are treated to a meal.  In masonry construction the rite celebrates the bedding of the last block or brick.

In some cases a topping out event is held at an intermediate point, such as when the roof is dried-in, which means the roof can provide at least semi-permanent protection from the elements.

The practice remains common in the United Kingdom and assorted Commonwealth countries such as Australia and Canada, as well as Germany, Austria, Slovenia, Iceland, Chile, Czech Republic, Slovakia, Poland, Hungary and the Baltic States. In the United States the last beam of a skyscraper is often painted white and signed by all the workers involved. In New Zealand, completion of the roof to a water-proof state is celebrated through a "roof shout", where workers are treated to cake and beer.

The tradition of "pannenbier" (literally "(roof) tile beer" in Dutch) is popular in the Netherlands and Flanders, where a national, regional or city flag is hung once the highest point of a building is reached. It stays in place until the building's owner provides free beer to the workers, after which it is lowered. It is considered greedy if it remains flown for more than a few days.

Gallery

See also

Groundbreaking

Notes

References
John V. Robinson (2001). "The 'topping out' traditions of the high-steel ironworkers". Western Folklore, Fall 2001. 
. Carpenter Magazine, Sep/Oct 2001.
https://web.archive.org/web/20070311032321/http://www.stp.uh.edu/vol68/160/news/news4.html Tree symbolizes campus' growth (tree is still a part of the ceremony); The Daily Cougar; Volume 68, Issue 160, Monday, 28 July 2003; accessed 11 February 2007.
. National Review, December 23, 2003

External links
 Richtfest.info A German language site about the topping out ceremonies.
 Topping out Roberts Pavilion Topping out the new athletic building at Claremont McKenna College.

Ceremonies
Building engineering
History of construction
Timber framing
Rituals attending construction